Alexander Serge de Buisonjé (born 19 July 1973) is a Dutch singer who performs in Dutch and English. He is also a TV presenter most well known for presenting Vrienden van Amstel LIVE! (2010) and Vrienden van Amstel zingen Kroonjuwelen (2012) which had a similar format but focused on performing songs of kroonjuweel calibre. He also presented Studio 9, where an artist would be sequestered for 36 hours along with a mystery artist from an entirely different genre, in order to create a brand new song together.

Discography

Albums
Studio albums

Live albums

Singles

References

External links
 
Official website

1973 births
Living people
People from Voorburg
21st-century Dutch male singers
21st-century Dutch singers